

Sally Read (born 1971 in Suffolk) is a British poet and writer and former psychiatric nurse.

Early life and education
Sally Read attended Tavistock Comprehensive School. She received a BA from Open University and then an MA from the University of South Dakota.

Work and awards
Read shared the Eric Gregory Award in 2001. Her first collection, The Point of Splitting, was shortlisted for the Jerwood-Aldeburgh First Collection prize. A selection of her works, Punto di Rottura, is also available in Italian.

Religious and personal life
A lifelong atheist, Read converted to Catholicism in 2010. She wrote a book about her conversion experience, Night's Bright Darkness.

Read is a poet in residence at The Hermitage of the Three Holy Hierarchs, which is an eparchial-rite form of consecrated life under the jurisdiction of Bishop Bryan Bayda, the Eparch of Ukrainian Catholic Eparchy of Saskatoon. Fr. Gregory Hrynkiw, of the group, played a role in her conversion.

Read lives with her husband and daughter in Santa Marinella.

Works
 The Point of Splitting (Bloodaxe Books, 2005)
 Broken Sleep (Bloodaxe Books, 2009)
 The Day Hospital (Bloodaxe Books, 2012)
 Night's Bright Darkness: A Modern Conversion Story (Ignatius Press, 2016)
 Annunciation: A Call to Faith in a Broken World (Ignatius Press, 2019)
  Dawn of this Hunger (Angelico Press, Second Spring, 2021)

References

External links
 

Converts to Roman Catholicism from atheism or agnosticism
English Catholic poets
English Roman Catholic writers
Alumni of the Open University
University of South Dakota alumni
English Roman Catholics
English expatriates in Italy
People from the Metropolitan City of Rome Capital
1971 births
Living people